Guo Wengui (born May 10, 1970—self claim or October 5, 1968), also known under the names Ho Wan Kwok, Miles Guo, and Miles Kwok, is an exiled Chinese billionaire businessman who became a political activist and controls Beijing Zenith Holdings (via proxies Li Lin and Jiang Yuehua), and other assets. At the peak of his career, he was the 73rd richest person in China. Guo was accused of corruption and other misdeeds by the Chinese authorities and fled to the United States in late 2014, after learning he was going to be arrested under allegations of bribery, kidnapping, money laundering, fraud and rape. Guo claims the charges are politically motivated and are a product of a campaign of political retribution carried out against him by the Chinese government. Guo is a colleague of Steve Bannon and a member of former U.S. President Donald Trump's Mar-a-Lago resort in Florida.

Guo claims to be a whistle-blower, but some of his statements were unable to be verified by newspapers such as The New York Times. Between 2018 and 2020, Guo launched two media projects with Bannon, G News and GTV Media Group. In 2021, Guo reached a settlement with the Securities and Exchange Commission to pay $539 million in refunds and fines in connection with illegal fundraising for the companies. In March 2023, Guo was arrested by U.S. federal authorities on fraud and money laundering charges.

Guo has been using an online misinformation network to promote the use of unproven treatments for COVID-19 as well as pushing conspiracy theories about vaccines developed by Pfizer and Moderna.

Biography
Guo was born in Shen County, Shandong, China. He is the seventh of eight children. He began his business career in Zhengzhou, before moving to Beijing to secure various construction deals during the 2008 Beijing Olympics.  In 2006, he delivered a Beijing deputy mayor's sex tape to the police. The deputy mayor, who had contested one of Guo's land deals, was subsequently imprisoned, allowing Guo to build the Pangu Plaza.

In 2014, Guo departed China after one of his political connections faced arrest. He moved to the United States in 2015. Guo, long prominent in real estate development and investment circles, came to fame in 2015 after a lengthy investigative report by Caixin media, controlled by Hu Shuli, was released, detailing Guo's political connections, business dealings, and hardball tactics against former rivals.

Guo responded by claiming Hu defamed him and responded with a set of personal accusations against Hu, claiming Hu had a romantic entanglement with his business rival. He opened a Twitter account in early 2017, frequently criticizing individuals within the Chinese establishment. He has reserved particular scorn for He Jintao, the son of former Central Commission for Discipline Inspection secretary He Guoqiang.

Many officials with whom he was said to have ties have fallen under the dragnet of the anti-corruption campaign under Xi Jinping, including Ma Jian, the former deputy director of Chinese Ministry of State Security (MSS), and Zhang Yue, the former Political and Legal Affairs Secretary of Hebei. While generally supportive of General Secretary Xi Jinping, Guo has characterized parts of the corruption campaign as a political witch hunt.

From the beginning of 2017, Guo is in self-imposed exile in New York City, where he owns a US$82 million apartment on the Upper East Side of Manhattan, overlooking Central Park. He has continued to conduct a political agenda to bring attention to corruption in the Chinese political system from his New York home. In November 2018, Guo put the apartment up for sale for US$67 million.

Guo is a member of former U.S. President Donald Trump's Mar-a-Lago resort in Florida and Mark's Club in Mayfair, London.

Since January 23, 2017, Guo accepted multiple interviews with media such as Mingjing, Voice of America (VOA) and BBC. Guo also started a campaign of accusing Chinese officials of corruption through live monologues on his YouTube and Twitter channel. On April 20, Guo's 3-hour live interview with VOA was abruptly terminated by the latter. Newspapers such as The New York Times, Financial Times, and Forbes also reported about Guo and his campaign. One of Guo's targets, HNA Group, sued Guo for defamation in June 2017.

In August 2018, several Hong Kong media, such as Ming Pao and South China Morning Post reported that Hong Kong Police had frozen the assets of the Guo family, accused of money laundering under the name of Guo's daughter Guo Mei. In March 2019, his mother died in China.

The book War for Eternity by Benjamin R. Teitelbaum details Guo's collaboration with Steve Bannon and the latter's attempt to undermine the Chinese government. On June 3, 2020, while aboard Guo's yacht in New York City waterways, he and Steve Bannon participated in an event declaring a "New Federal State of China" that "would overthrow the Chinese government". In New York City, planes were seen carrying banners which said "Congratulations to Federal State of New China!". In August 2020, Bannon was arrested by federal authorities during an early morning raid on Guo's $35 million luxury yacht, docked in Connecticut, under charges of stealing millions of dollars from the We Build The Wall non-profit organization.

In February 2022 Guo filed for chapter 11 bankruptcy. In a filing for the bankruptcy Guo estimated that his total assets are currently worth between $50,001 and $100,000, while his liabilities range between $100 million and $500 million.

Beijing Zenith Holdings
Beijing Zenith Holdings was a company owned in 2013 by Li Lin and Jiang Yuehua via two corporate entities ( and ). The company acquired a minority stake in PKU Healthcare from state-owned Founder Group's PKU Healthcare Group. However, Beijing Zenith Holdings allegedly failed to pay PKU Healthcare Group after the shares were already transferred. To finalize the payment, Beijing Zenith Holdings allegedly borrowed the money from PKU Resources Group Holdings, a sister company of PKU Healthcare Group. All three companies were fined by the China Securities Regulatory Commission in 2016.

In 2015, Chinese media reported that Zenith Holdings was actually owned by Guo Wengui, and Li Lin and Jiang Yuehua were his proxies.

Zenith Holdings also acquired a minority stake in Founder Securities by underwriting the new shares.

In October 2018, Zenith Holdings was fined CNY 60 billion for irregularity in acquiring the securities company. In its ruling, the court in Dalian found that Beijing Zenith had made RMB 11.9 billion in illegal profits.

Credibility of documents
On October 5, 2017, Guo made public in Washington a so-called "confidential document of the Chinese government" with the self-proclaimed verification of the U.S. government, featuring China's "working plan of secretly dispatching 27 police officers" to the United States on field duty in 2017.

On January 2, 2018, The Washington Free Beacon published another such document, featuring China's "decision on conducting communication and coordination work" between China and the North Korea to further a solution to the nuclear issue.

Both documents received media attention, with even the U.S. Department of State claiming their own close attention.

On April 23, 2018, The Chongqing Municipal Public Security Bureau held a press conference on the forgery of national-level documents by Guo. They reported that Guo had incited and instigated twin brothers Chen Zhiyu and Chen Zhiheng to forge over 30 national-level official documents as the main content of his so-called "revelation" online, which were documents faked to be issued by the Central Committee of the Chinese Communist Party, the State Council, and its relevant ministries and commissions.

The proceedings state that in May 2017, Guo Wengui publicly offered rewards for so-called "confidential documents" of the Chinese Government, which was deemed a profitable opportunity by Chen Zhiyu and Chen Zhiheng. The former reached out to Guo under the pseudonym "Zhou Guoming". Guo started working with Chen Zhiyu in August 2017. They agreed that a 4,000 US dollars monthly salary would be paid to hire Chen Zhiyu, who would work full-time to provide needed materials for Guo's "revelation." Guo also promised to cover Chen's travel expenses and fees to purchase mobile phones, and contribute 50 million dollars to set up a fund at Chen's disposal. At the invitation by Guo Wengui, Chen Zhiyu met with Guo and his assistants in the U.S. four times. Chongqing police found that since August 2017, Guo has been in league with the Chen brothers, instigating them to forge more than 30 official documents in the name of the CCP Central Committee, the State Council, and related ministries and commissions, before spreading the documents overseas. Guo and the Chen brothers have also fabricated information claiming that a number of central and provincial government officials had illegitimate children, houses, mistresses and large bank deposits abroad, according to the investigation.

On February 18, 2018, Chongqing police arrested Chen Zhiyu and Chen Zhiheng in the provinces of Guangdong and Hunan respectively, and confiscated related items. Both suspects confessed their crimes of forging official documents to the police. Police also discovered a large number of allegedly forged official documents of state organs in the suspects' computers and hard drives, involving areas such as China's national defense, diplomacy and financial policies. They also found allegedly fabricated files of the CCP's Central Commission for Discipline Inspection.

Criminal charges
In April 2017, an Interpol notice was issued for Guo's arrest, requested by the Chinese government. In June 2017, staff of one of Guo's other investment vehicles, Pangu Investment, were charged for scamming banks on loans. The staff members accused all alleged that they were under the orders of Guo.

By June 2017, the Chinese government sent U.S. President Donald Trump a letter, delivered by casino businessman Steve Wynn, requesting for Guo to be deported to China. Unnamed sources "familiar with [a] meeting" allege that Trump was inclined to deport Guo, a member of his Mar-a-Lago resort, but that his advisors opposed deporting him by reasoning that he could be used for political leverage against China.

Misinformation campaign against Guo

A study by the Australian Strategic Policy Institute which analysed the tweets of Chinese government controlled accounts banned by Twitter in response to the 2019–20 Hong Kong protests found that the accounts had distributed more material attacking Guo Wengui than any other target including the Hong Kong protestors. Other dissidents targeted by the bot network included Gui Minhai and Yu Wensheng as well as PLA veterans. In another report from the South China Morning Post, the researchers found that more than 38,000 tweets from 618 of the now-suspended Twitter accounts targeted Guo.

Civil lawsuits
Several companies sued Guo's Pangu Investment and Zenith Holdings in the civil court of the United States, in order to reclaim the non-performing loan the companies allegedly lent to Guo.

In April 2017, Pacific Alliance Asia Opportunity Fund brought suit against Guo in the Commercial Division of New York County, where Guo resided and was seeking asylum from the United States government. In 2008, Pacific Alliance loaned $30 million to Guo's Hong Kong company in connection with the development of Pangu Plaza, site of a "7 Star Hotel" in Beijing near the Olympic arenas. In connection with the loan, Guo signed a personal guarantee. All of the documents and transactions were executed in Hong Kong or China. According to Pacific Alliance, Guo owes approximately $88 million in principal and accrued interest on the loan. In 2020, an apartment worth $55 million that an investment fund bought for Guo's use was seized in a bankruptcy proceeding in connection with the lawsuit.

In August 2017, the Chinese conglomerate HNA Group filed a defamation lawsuit in New York against Guo, said Guo made "repeatedly false and defamatory statements", including a claim that Yao Qing, a nephew of Wang Qishan, former Secretary of the Central Commission for Discipline Inspection and close supporter of General Secretary of the Chinese Communist Party Xi Jinping, is one of HNA's shareholders. HNA said the comments caused the company to lose business and suffer a drop in share prices, but Guo said he welcomes a legal spat with giant Chinese conglomerate in the United States. In March 2019, however, HNA claimed that Guo's statements had no longer caught public attention and planned to drop this suit. Almost at the same time, Guo posted tweets on his own social media "Guo Media" declaring that he refused to withdraw from the HNA case and would continue.

On November 20, 2018, Guo held a conference with his close friend Steve Bannon in New York about the death of Wang Jian in France, who was the former chairman of HNA Group. During the conference, he announced the establishment of "Rule of Law foundation" for investigations about Chinese government financial activities as well as those of its supporters and offering financial support for businessmen, officials and others who are persecuted by Chinese Communist Party (CCP) and forced to flee overseas like Guo himself. This foundation consists of two parts which are different types of nonprofit organization. One part called "Rule of Law Foundation" is type 501(c)(3) while the other part called "Rule of Law Society" is type 501(c)(4). Kyle Bass serves as the chairman of part 501(c)(3) and Steve Bannon serves as the chairman of part 501(c)(4). The first donation was $100 million from Guo.

In December 2018, Roger Stone agreed to a settlement with Guo in which Stone would retract a false claim, published , that Guo had donated to Hillary Clinton.

In July 2019, Guo won a lawsuit in a defamation case with former university professor Xia Yeliang, which is considered as a "rare case of successful action by public figure" by some analysts.

On July 23, 2019, Strategic Vision US LLC, a US commercial research firm which has a commercial dispute with Guo, sued Guo in the US federal court, said Guo was a spy for the CCP. However, this lawsuit was dismissed, and after that Guo filed a US$50 million defamation lawsuit in New York state against several companies and individuals including Strategic Vision US and CNN host Erin Burnett, who called him a spy during the Outfront television program.

In August 2019, it was revealed that the Hong Kong Police Force froze bank accounts of Guo and other family members in 2017; in court documents requesting funds be released filed by Anton Development Limited, a company held by Guo's daughter Guo Mei. The freezing is part of a judicial review against the freezing of various assets linked to Guo and in relation to a HK$32.9 billion (S$5.8 billion) money laundering investigation, where court filings focus on Guo and other family members using their personal bank accounts and the bank accounts of Anton Development Limited and Hong Kong International Funds Investments Limited; the frozen accounts are said to total at least HK$1.56 billion. A writ provided by Anton Development Limited to police reportedly stated that HK$730 million in the frozen accounts were investment funds from a sovereign fund in Abu Dhabi.

G News

G News is a website owned by Guo Media – a company associated with Guo – operating in collaboration with Steve Bannon, a former executive chairman of Breitbart News and former advisor to the Trump administration. Guo Media paid Bannon $1 million in exchange for consulting services from August 2018 to August 2019, and Bannon has an office in Guo Media's headquarters. Both Guo and Bannon are regularly featured in G News videos that criticize the Chinese government.

Guo and Bannon later co-founded GTV Media Group in 2020, which operates the Chinese video website GTV.

Controversies
Guo's media were noted for spreading misinformation during the COVID-19 pandemic. On January 25, 2020, G News claimed that the Chinese government was going to admit that the coronavirus disease 2019 (COVID-19) was accidentally leaked from a "P4 lab in Wuhan" that was associated with "covert biological weapon programs". Fact checker PolitiFact found no evidence to corroborate G News's claim, and determined it to be false, classifying it as misinformation related to the COVID-19 pandemic.

According to Foreign Policy, G News network pushed false stories and conspiracy theories during and before the 2020 United States presidential election, including disseminating disinformation about Hunter Biden. Guo also has large following on Twitter that shares the unverified stories immediately after the publication. As of December 2020, Guo's Twitter account, which had over half a million followers, has been suspended.

In 2020, the Wall Street Journal reported that GTV companies were being investigated by federal and state authorities for illegal fundraising. The following year, the companies reached an SEC settlement to repay over $480 million to more than 5,000 investors as well as $35 million in fines.

In 2020, New York Times reported that Guo along with Steve Bannon had been promoting Dr. Li-Meng Yan. They bought Dr. Yan a plane ticket to the United States, provided her accommodation, coached her in media appearances and helped secure interviews with conservative tv hosts including Tucker Carlson. Yan later made unsubstantiated pandemic claims that the Covid-19 virus was artificially made however her research was rejected as misinformation by scientists who called her paper as unscientific and "a polemic dressed up in jargon".

Allegations of picketing other dissidents
In December 2020 Teng Biao said Guo had arranged picketing of the homes of Teng and other dissidents, accusing them of conspiring with the Chinese government. This led to conflicting theories about what Guo was trying to achieve.

2023 fraud
Guo was arrested on March 15, 2023 in New York by Federal authorities, for conspiracy to defraud his online followers out of more than $1 billion. These included $452 million in unregistered offering and $150 million in loans for GTV, in addition to $250 million for membership programmes and $262 million for the Himalaya Exchange cryptocurrency project.

See also
 Hao Haidong
 Gettr

References

Businesspeople from Shandong
Living people
People from Liaocheng
Chinese billionaires
Chinese emigrants to the United States
Year of birth missing (living people)
Fugitives wanted on bribery charges
Fugitives wanted on kidnapping charges
Fugitives wanted on sex crime charges
Activists from New York City